Mziwamadoda Yako (born 4 October 1989) is a South African rugby union player for Spring Rose in the EPRU Grand Challenge. His regular position is hooker.

Career
He then played for Western Province Amateurs and club side SK Walmers for a few seasons before being included in the  squad for the 2012 Vodacom Cup. He didn't make any appearances for them and joined  for the 2012 Currie Cup First Division.

He left the EP Kings at the end of 2014 without making an appearance, but was then included in the Spring Rose side that competed in the 2014 SARU Community Cup.

References

South African rugby union players
Eastern Province Elephants players
Boland Cavaliers players
Living people
1989 births
Rugby union hookers
Rugby union players from Port Elizabeth